James Bradbury Jr. (October 5, 1894 – January 21, 1936) was an American character actor in supporting roles in films of the 1920s and 1930s.

Biography
The son of veteran character actor James Bradbury (1857–1940), New York-born Bradbury Jr. began his career on stage as a child in Madame Butterfly. Both Bradburys arrived in Hollywood around 1920, and Junior played Richard Barthelmess' rival in Classmates (1924) and The Drop Kick (1927). Other roles followed, including numerous budget westerns such as The Glorious Trail (1928), Cheyenne  (1929), Smilin' Guns (1929) and The Cisco Kid (1931). Later film roles tended to get smaller and uncredited, such as his bit in The Marx Brothers's Monkey Business (1931), although one of his last parts, "third vampire" opposite Bela Lugosi in Tod Browning's Mark of the Vampire (1935), showcased his distinctive boney features to good effect. By this time, however, even small parts were eluding him and he killed himself in 1936, aged 41.

Partial filmography
 Bits of Life (1921)
 Classmates (1924)
 Fear-Bound (1925)
 Exclusive Rights (1926)
 Kentucky Handicap (1926)
 The Little Giant (1926)
 The Drop Kick (1927)
 Hidden Aces (1927)
 She's a Sheik (1927)
 The Wreck (1927)
 Hellship Bronson (1928)
 Flying Romeos (1928)
The Glorious Trail (1928)
 Code of the Air (1928)
 Cheyenne (1929)
 Smilin' Guns (1929)
 Alibi (1929) (uncredited)
 The Great Meadow (1931) (uncredited)
 The Cisco Kid (1931)
 Monkey Business (1931) (uncredited)
 Soul of the Slums (1931)
 Gorilla Ship (1932)
 Song of the Eagle (1933)
 Mark of the Vampire (1935)

External links

1894 births
1936 deaths
American male film actors
20th-century American male actors
Suicides in California
1936 suicides
Male Western (genre) film actors